Pishchanka is an urban-type settlement in Vinnytsia Oblast, located in the historic region of Podolia. It was formerly the administrative center of Pishchanka Raion, but is now administered within Tulchyn Raion. Since 1956 Pishchanka is an urban settlement. Population:

History 
Until the Partitions of Poland Pishchanka was part of the Bracław Voivodeship of the Lesser Poland Province of the Polish Crown.

References

External links
 Pishchanka at the Ukrainian Soviet Encyclopedia

Urban-type settlements in Tulchyn Raion
Olgopolsky Uyezd